149 (one hundred [and] forty-nine) is the natural number between 148 and 150.

In mathematics
149 is a prime number, the first prime whose difference from the previous prime is exactly 10, an emirp, and an irregular prime. After 1 and 127, it is the third smallest de Polignac number, an odd number that cannot be represented as a prime plus a power of two. More strongly, after 1, it is the second smallest number that is not a sum of two prime powers.

It is a tribonacci number, being the sum of the three preceding terms, 24, 44, 81.

There are exactly 149 integer points in a closed circular disk of radius 7, and exactly 149 ways of placing six queens (the maximum possible) on a 5 × 5 chess board so that each queen attacks exactly one other. The barycentric subdivision of a tetrahedron produces an abstract simplicial complex with exactly 149 simplices.

See also
 The year AD 149 or 149 BC
 List of highways numbered 149

References

External links

Integers